MV Portaferry II is a passenger and car ferry operated by Transport NI. This ferry serves the Portaferry–Strangford ferry route across the mouth of Strangford Lough in Northern Ireland, a service which has been in operation since the 12th century.

History
After years of service, MV Strangford Ferry, which was launched on 6 September 1969, began to show signs of age. A second, smaller ship, MV Portaferry Ferry, also operating on the Portaferry - Strangford route, had insufficient capacity to take over full service for route, so a new ship was needed. This new vessel was the Portaferry II, built by McTay Marine of Merseyside, at a cost of a £2.7 million. She entered service on 18 December 2001, replacing the aging MV Portaferry Ferry and relegated the MV Strangford Ferry, to a support role.

Details
She is propelled by a pair of Voith Schneider propellers, driven by diesel engines, and is registered in Belfast.

Like her predecessors, due to the short travel time the only onboard facilities are a passenger waiting area and a gangway on one side of the ship with benches and placards to inform readers of the lough's wildlife.

References

External links

Ferries of Northern Ireland
2001 ships
Ro-ro ships
Ships built in England